Russell Huntley, along with his brother Lewis Huntley, founded the Illinois city of DeKalb. The pair owned most of the land that would become DeKalb. County surveyor Daniel W. Lamb platted two sections of DeKalb township as a new village in November 1853, a village originally known as Huntley's Grove. Huntley gave the Galena and Chicago Union Railroad (later the Chicago and North Western Railway) right-of-way across his land and a site for a depot. Other railroad investors also received land for speculative purposes.

Notes

American city founders
People from DeKalb, Illinois
Year of birth missing
Year of death missing
Place of birth missing
Place of death missing